Gatewood is an unincorporated community in Fayette County, in the U.S. state of West Virginia.

The community was named after Elizabeth Gatewood Bibb, the wife of an early settler.

References

Unincorporated communities in Fayette County, West Virginia
Unincorporated communities in West Virginia